Ten Years After is an English blues rock band.

Ten Years After may also refer to:

Ten Years After (Ten Years After album)
Ten Years After (Theatre of Hate album)
Ten Years After (Tommy Keene album)
10 Years After (album), album by Jerusalem

See also 
 10 Years Later (disambiguation)